Cornwall Island may refer to:
 In Canada:
 Cornwall Island in Nunavut
 Cornwall Island in Ontario
 In Antarctica:
 Cornwall Island off Robert Island in the South Shetland Islands